Mona Ozouf born Mona Annig Sohier (born 24 February 1931) is a French historian and philosopher. Born into a family of schoolteachers keen on preserving the language and culture of Brittany, she graduated as a teacher of philosophy from the École normale supérieure de jeunes filles.  After teaching philosophy, she joined the CNRS as a historian. Her research and writings are centred on the French Revolution and on the French secular education system. Notable publications include L'École, l'Église et la République, 1871–1914 (1963) and La fête révolutionnaire, 1789–1799 (1976), published in English as Festivals and the French Revolution (1988).

Biography
Born on 24 February 1931 at Lannilis, Finistère, Mona Annig Sohier is the daughter of the schoolteachers Yann Sohier (1901–1935) and Anne Le Den. In 1955, she married the historian :fr:Jacques Ozouf (1928–2006).

After, her father died when she was only four years old, she was brought up by her mother and grandmother. She was rarely allowed outside the school where her mother was headmistress, except for regular visits to the village church with her grandmother. As a result, she became fascinated by literature, reading all the books she could lay her hands on.

After attending high school in Saint-Brieuc, she studied philosophy at the École Normale Supérieure from 1952. Like many of her fellow students, she joined the Communist party but left four years later after the repression of the Hungarian Revolution of 1956, deciding not to become involved in politics. She taught philosophy for a period but then turned to history after meeting a group of historians, Denis Richet, Emmanuel Le Roy Ladurie and François Furet at the National Library. She worked with them to produce the Dictionnaire critique de la Révolution française, published in English in 1988 as A Critical Dictionary of the French Revolution. With her husband who died in 1977, she developed La République des instituteurs, published in 1989.

Becoming a recognized scholar of the French Revolution, in 1976 she published her seminal work, La fête révolutionnaire, 1789–1799. The English translation, Festivals and the French Revolution was published in 1988. Her analysis of the symbols and images of the many different festivals she reviewed contributed significantly to the understanding of the Revolution and of French culture in general.

Ozouf has also undertaken an analysis of ten outstanding women in French history, publishing Les Mots des femmes or Women's Words in 1995.

Awards and honours
Ozouf has received many prestigious awards and honours, including the Grand prix Gobert in 2004 for her historical work, the literary prize Prix mondial Cino Del Duca in 2007, the Ordre des Arts et des Lettres also in 2007, and the Breton awards Order of the Ermine and Prix Breizh in 2009. More recently, she has been honoured as a Commander of National Order of Merit (2011), Commander of the Legion of Honour (2014), the Prix de la langue française (2015) and Grand Officer of the National Order of Merit (2017).

References

Further reading

1931 births
Living people
People from Finistère
French philosophers
French women philosophers
20th-century French historians
French women historians
20th-century French writers
Academic staff of the School for Advanced Studies in the Social Sciences
Commandeurs of the Ordre des Arts et des Lettres
Grand Officers of the Ordre national du Mérite
Grand Officiers of the Légion d'honneur
Recipients of the Ordre des Arts et des Lettres
Recipients of the Ordre national du Mérite
Breton historians
20th-century French women